This article concerns the Buffalo Bulls football records. These records include game statistics from when the Bulls first joined the Mid-American Conference in 1999. Games that went overtime are included, along with records of games between the Buffalo Bulls and teams belonging to the Bowl Championship Series.

Year-by-year results

All-time MAC records
Statistics correct as of the end of the 2017–18 college football season

This table includes all MAC games from 1999, the year the Bulls joined the Mid-American Conference.

Overtime
Statistics correct as of the end of the 2017–18 college football season
Following the 1995 season, the NCAA changed the rules to allow for overtime on games tied at the end of four quarters.  Until that time, the Bulls had tied 28 times.  Since then, Buffalo has participated in twelve overtimes game and have won eight of those games.

Buffalo vs. the BCS
Statistics correct as of the end of the 2013–14 college football season

Since joining the MAC in 1999, the Bulls have played 34 regular season games and 1 postseason game against teams that are a member of one of the six conferences of the Bowl Championship Series, and have gone 2–33 all time against them (2–32 in the regular season, and 0–1 in the postseason). The Bulls have gone 0–2 against the ACC, 0–5 against the Big Ten, 0–4 against the Big 12, 2–21 against the Big East (0–1 in postseason play), and 0–3 against the SEC. The Bulls have yet to play against a team from the Pac-12 Conference. This table includes only games with teams that were members of one of the six BCS conferences at the time the game indicated was played. The conferences indicated are also reflective of the conference the team was a member of at the time the game was played.

References

Buffalo Bulls football